Três Fronteiras (Portuguese meaning "three borders") is a municipality in the state of São Paulo in Brazil. The population is 5,832 (2020 est.) in an area of 151.59 km². The elevation is 395 m. The name Três Fronteiras refers to the nearby tripoint of the states São Paulo, Minas Gerais and Mato Grosso do Sul, but the municipality does not touch this tripoint. Most of the population are farmers.

References

External links
  http://www.citybrazil.com.br/sp/tresfronteiras/

Municipalities in São Paulo (state)